The 2016 elections for the Pennsylvania House of Representatives were held on November 8, 2016, with all districts being contested. The primary elections were held on April 26, 2016. The term of office for those elected in 2016 began when the House of Representatives convened in January 2017. Pennsylvania State Representatives are elected for two-year terms, with all 203 seats up for election every two years.

Results overview

Results by district

Source:

See also
 Pennsylvania House of Representatives election, 2018

References

2016 Pennsylvania elections
2016
Pennsylvania House of Representatives